Elmstead may refer to:

Elmstead, Essex, a village in Essex, England
Elmstead Market, a hamlet in Essex, England
Elmstead, London, an area of Greater London, England
Elmstead Pit, a geological SSSI 
Elmstead Wood, a woodland
Elmstead Woods railway station 
Elmstead, Ontario, an area of the town of Lakeshore, Ontario, Canada

See also
Elmsted, a village in Kent, United Kingdom